CZE may refer to:
 Czech Republic (ISO abbreviation)
 Czech language
 Capillary electrophoresis
 Cryptozoic Entertainment, a trading card game manufacturer
 José Leonardo Chirino Airport IATA code